Lycomorpha is a genus of moths in the family Erebidae. The genus was erected by Thaddeus William Harris in 1839.

Species
Lycomorpha grotei (Packard, 1864)
Lycomorpha regulus (Grinnell, 1903)
Lycomorpha fulgens (H. Edwards, 1881)
Lycomorpha splendens Barnes & McDunnough, 1912
Lycomorpha pholus (Drury, 1773) 
Lycomorpha desertus H. Edwards, 1881

References

External links
L. pholus. University of Florida IFAS.

Cisthenina
Moth genera